Callum Jamieson (born 31 July 1997) is an Australian rules footballer, playing for the West Coast Eagles in the Australian Football League (AFL).

Early life
Jamieson grew up in the Beachside suburb of Trigg, leading to a love of surfing from a young age. He spent his junior days playing for North Beach Junior Football Club and attended Newman College. Jamieson originally wanted to become a professional surfer or pilot, but both these dreams couldn't be achieved due to his size. Jamieson started his football career as a Key Forward. After getting overlooked in the 2018 national draft, Jamieson added 8 kg and 4 cm and switched positions to Ruck, playing in the Western Australian State Team at the 2019 AFL Under 18 Championships, breaking their ten-year championship drought. Jamieson's position change was a key part in Claremont winning the 2019 WAFL Colts Grand Final, with Claremont winning the hit out count 43 to 29, largely thanks to Jamieson's 34 hit outs despite going down with a shoulder injury in the last quarter After his breakout 2019 season Jamieson was selected at pick 49 by the West Coast Eagles at the 2019 National Draft.

AFL career
Because of the Eagles' Ruck depth, with Nic Naitanui, Tom Hickey and Nathan Vardy already established rucks at the club, Jamieson was drafted as a developing ruck/forward, who would be spending time developing in the WAFL to be ready for AFL level. Unfortuantly, due to the coronavirus pandemic, the 2020 WAFL season was cancelled, haltering Jamieson's development. Jamieson was able to play 13 games during the 2021 WAFL season, playing ruck with stints as key defender. On 5 May 2021, West Coast, impressed with Jamieson's development resigned him until the end of the 2022 AFL season.

2022
Jamieson added 7 kg to his frame during the 2022 preseason and made his AFL debut in Round 2 against North Melbourne after the eagles had twelve players placed into the AFL's health and safety protocols. Jamieson was named at full back, and didn't have a spectacular start to his AFL career with North Melbourne forward Nick Larkey kicking five goals against him. Jamieson was subsequently omitted for the Eagles next fixture. Jamieson was later brought back into the team as seven players were injured or placed into the AFL's health and safety protocols. Jamieson impressed on his return to the senior side, with twelve disposals and thirteen hit outs and kept his place in the lineup for next round.

Statistics
Statistics are correct to the end of round 14, 2022

|- style="background-color: #EAEAEA"
|style="text-align:center"|2022
|style="text-align:center;"|
| 40 || 7 || 0 || 0 || 22 || 40 || 62 || 14 || 18 || 60 || 0 || 0 || 3.14 || 5.71 || 8.86 || 2.0 || 2.57 || 8.57
|- class="sortbottom"
! colspan=3| Career
! 7 !! 0 !! 0 !! 22 !! 40 !! 62 !! 14 !! 18 !! 60 !! 0 !! 0 !! 3.14 !! 5.71 !! 8.86 !! 2.0 !! 2.57 !! 8.57
|}

Notes

References

External links

2000 births
Living people
Australian rules footballers from Western Australia
West Coast Eagles players